James John Maher (11 April 1913 – 17 April 1977) was an Australian rules footballer who played with South Melbourne in the Victorian Football League (VFL).

Notes

External links 

1913 births
1977 deaths
Australian rules footballers from Victoria (Australia)
Sydney Swans players